Helenendorf may refer to the following places in Azerbaijan:

 Goygol (city), named Helenendorf until 1931
 Bibiheybət, a municipality in Baku, formerly known as Helenendorf